South Kensington is a London Underground station in the district of South Kensington, south west London. It is served by the District, Circle and Piccadilly lines. On the District and Circle lines it is between Gloucester Road and Sloane Square, and on the Piccadilly line between Gloucester Road and Knightsbridge. It is in Travelcard Zone 1. The main station entrance is located at the junction of Old Brompton Road (A3218), Thurloe Place, Harrington Road, Onslow Place and Pelham Street. Subsidiary entrances are located in Exhibition Road giving access by pedestrian tunnel to the Natural History, Science and Victoria and Albert Museums. Also close by are the Royal Albert Hall, Imperial College London, the Royal College of Music, the London branch of the Goethe-Institut and the Ismaili Centre.

The station is in two parts: sub-surface platforms opened in 1868 by the Metropolitan Railway and the District Railway as part of the companies' extension of the Inner Circle route eastwards from Gloucester Road to Westminster and deep level platforms opened in 1906 by the Great Northern, Piccadilly and Brompton Railway. A variety of underground and main line services have operated over the sub-surface tracks, which have been modified several times to suit operational demands with the current arrangement being achieved in the 1960s. The deep-level platforms have remained largely unaltered, although the installation of escalators in the 1970s to replace lifts improved interchanges between the two parts of the station. Parts of the sub-surface station and the Exhibition Road pedestrian tunnel are Grade II listed.

History

Sub-surface station
The station was opened on 24 December 1868 by the Metropolitan Railway (MR, later the Metropolitan line) and the District Railway (DR, later the District line). The MR had previously opened an extension from Paddington (Praed Street) (now Paddington) to Gloucester Road on 1 October 1868 and opened tracks to South Kensington to connect to the DR when the DR opened the first section of its line to Westminster. The original South Kensington station, designed by the MR's engineer John Fowler, had two platforms although it was intended that this would be supplemented as DR services extended.

On 1 August 1870, the DR opened additional tracks between Gloucester Road and South Kensington. On 10 July 1871, the DR opened its own facilities at South Kensington. The enlarged station had two through platforms for each company and a bay platform for terminating MR trains from the west. The junction between the two companies' tracks was also moved from the west side of the station to the east side.

On 1 February 1872, the DR opened a northbound branch from its station at Earl's Court to connect to the West London Extension Joint Railway (WLEJR, now the West London Line) at Addison Road (now Kensington (Olympia)). From that date the Outer Circle service began running over the DR's tracks. The service was run by the North London Railway (NLR) from its terminus at Broad Street (now demolished) in the City of London via the North London Line to Willesden Junction, then the West London Line to Addison Road and the DR to Mansion House – at that time the eastern terminus of the DR.

From 1 August 1872, the Middle Circle service also began operations through South Kensington, running from Moorgate along the MR's tracks on the north side of the Inner Circle to Paddington, then over the Hammersmith & City Railway (H&CR) track to Latimer Road, then, via a now demolished link, on the WLEJR to Addison Road and the DR to Mansion House. The service was operated jointly by the H&CR and the DR.

On 4 May 1885, the DR opened a pedestrian subway running from the station beneath the length of Exhibition Road, giving sheltered access to the newly built museums for a toll of 1 penny. Although it had cost £42,614 to construct (approximately £ today), it was closed on 10 November 1886 and afterwards was opened only occasionally for special museum events. In 1890, the South Kensington and Paddington Subway (SK&PS), a proposed cut-and-cover railway planned to run from South Kensington to Paddington station, offered to purchase the under-used pedestrian subway for use as the first section of its tunnel. The DR continued to open the subway intermittently and charged a toll until 1908, when it was opened permanently for free. On 30 June 1900, the Middle Circle service was withdrawn between Earl's Court and Mansion House, and, on 31 December 1908, the Outer Circle service was also shortened to terminate at Earl's Court. In 1907, the current arcaded station entrance was opened to a design by George Sherrin.

In 1949, the Metropolitan line-operated Inner Circle route was given its own identity on the tube map as the Circle line. In June 1957, the reversing bay track was taken out of use and the track bed was later filled to connect the two island platforms. The eastbound MR platform (Number 1) and westbound DR platform (Number 4) were taken out of use in January 1966 and March 1969 respectively. The tracks for these platforms were also removed and platform 4 was subsequently demolished in the early 1970s to allow escalators to be provided to the Piccadilly line. The widened island platform is now served by the District and Circle lines in both directions. Following the closure of platforms 1 and 4, platform 3 was renumbered as 1. The current arrangement has trains running in opposite directions to the original layout. During service disruption or engineering works, trains can also run Eastbound from Platform 1. The arcaded station entrance and shops, the brick retaining walls to the sub-surface platforms and the Exhibition Road pedestrian tunnel are Grade II listed structures.

Over the decades, there were also a number of aborted attempts to build above the station with hotels, offices and a shopping mall proposed at times. None were built.

Deep-level station

By the beginning of the 20th century, the DR had been extended to Richmond, Ealing Broadway, Hounslow West and Wimbledon in the west and to New Cross Gate in the east. The southern section of the Inner Circle was suffering considerable congestion between South Kensington and Mansion House, between which stations the DR was running an average of 20 trains per hour with more in the peak periods.

To relieve the congestion, the DR planned an express deep-level tube line starting from a connection to its sub-surface tracks west of Gloucester Road and running to Mansion House. The tunnels were planned to run about  beneath the existing sub-surface route with only one intermediate stop at Charing Cross (now Embankment). Parliamentary approval was obtained in 1897 but no work was done. In 1898, the DR took over the Brompton and Piccadilly Circus Railway (B&PCR) which had a route planned from South Kensington to Piccadilly Circus. The route was modified to join the DR deep-level route at South Kensington.

Following the purchase of the DR by the Underground Electric Railways Company of London in 1902, the planned DR and B&PCR lines were merged with a third proposed route from the Great Northern and Strand Railway. The DR deep-level route was revised at its western end to continue to Earl's Court and surface to the east of Barons Court.

The deep-level platforms were opened on 15 December 1906 by the Great Northern, Piccadilly and Brompton Railway (GNP&BR, now the Piccadilly line) which ran between Finsbury Park and Hammersmith. The platforms are placed eastbound above westbound and were originally served by lifts from street level stopping at both platform levels. Eastbound GNP&BR trains and DR trains would have shared the same platform with the two routes separating at a junction immediately to the east of the station. Westbound trains would have had separate platforms at the lower level with the routes merging at a junction west of the station. Though closed-off from the rest of the station, it was linked to the lift lobby and was tiled to match the other platforms. Enlarged tunnel sections for the junctions were constructed with the original running tunnels and remain visible from passing trains. A new surface building on Pelham Street for the lifts was designed by Leslie Green with the GNP&BR's distinctive ox-blood red glazed terracotta façade.

The unused westbound tunnel was used during World War I to store art from the Victoria & Albert Museum and china from Buckingham Palace and, from 1927 to 1939, was used as a signalling school. During World War II it contained equipment to detect bombs falling in the River Thames which might require the emergency floodgates on the under-river tunnels to be closed.

In the early 1970s the lifts to the Piccadilly line platforms were replaced by escalators, with one pair being provided between the ticket hall and a new intermediate level, where it met a linking passageway to the Circle and District line platforms, and three being provided from there to a lower concourse between the levels of the two Piccadilly line platforms. Stairs up and down from the lower concourse connect to the platforms. The stairs and passage to the westbound platform are located in the disused DR westbound platform tunnel. With the introduction of escalators, the GNP&BR station building was taken out of use.

In February 2021, access to the Piccadilly line was closed in order to replace the escalators. The work was completed by June 2022.

Future proposals
Many stations on the Circle line which were originally constructed in open cuttings have been subject to air-rights developments where cuttings have been roofed over with buildings built above.
In December 2016, Transport for London published outline proposals prepared by architects BuckleyGrayYeoman for a redevelopment of the buildings to the west of the station arcade and in Thurloe Street and space to the south of the station cutting on Pelham Street. The proposal includes bringing the disused northern platform back into use for eastbound trains, a new entrance to Thurloe Street, a reconfigured ticket hall and provision of step-free access throughout the station.

Services
The station is in Travelcard Zone 1 On the District and Circle lines, the station is between Gloucester Road and Sloane Square, and on the Piccadilly line, it is between Gloucester Road and Knightsbridge. South Kensington is the easternmost interchange between these three lines. Train frequencies vary throughout the day, but generally District line trains operate every 2–6 minutes from approximately 05:15 to 00:30 eastbound and 05:45 to 00:45 westbound; they are supplemented by Circle line trains every 8–12 minutes from approximately 05:30 to 00:30 clockwise and 05:40 to 00:15 anticlockwise. Piccadilly line trains operate every 2–6 minutes from approximately 05:40 to 00:25 eastbound and 05:50 to 00:40 westbound.

On the Piccadilly line 1973 Stock is used. On the Circle and District lines S Stock is used.

Connections
London Buses routes 14, 49, 70, 74, 345, 360, 414, 430 and C1 and night routes N74 and N97 serve the station.
There is a Santander Cycles rental station north of the station in Thurlow Street.

In literature
South Kensington is one of two tube stations (the other being Sloane Square) mentioned in the song "When you're lying awake" from the operetta Iolanthe by Gilbert and Sullivan.

Notes and references

Notes

References

Bibliography

External links

London Transport Museum Photographic Archive

Circle line (London Underground) stations
District line stations
Piccadilly line stations
London Underground Night Tube stations
Tube stations in the Royal Borough of Kensington and Chelsea
Former Great Northern, Piccadilly and Brompton Railway stations
Former Metropolitan Railway stations
Railway stations in Great Britain opened in 1868
Former Metropolitan District Railway stations
Railway stations in Great Britain opened in 1871
Brompton, London
Tube station
Leslie Green railway stations